Waldorf Astoria Edinburgh - The Caledonian is a five-star hotel in Edinburgh, Scotland. Opened in December 1903, it is an example of a British grand railway hotel, formerly called The Caledonian Hotel, and nicknamed 'The Caley'. It stands at the west end of Princes Street and is a category A listed building.

Construction

The Caledonian Hotel, constructed from 1899 to 1903, was part of the Caledonian Railway's Edinburgh Princes Street railway station. It was a rival to the North British Railway's North British Hotel, which opened at the other end of Princes Street in 1903. The hotel was built on top of the stone, V-shaped station building that had been recently built as a replacement for the previous wooden station, which was damaged in a fire in June 1890. The architects of the hotel were John More Dick Peddie and George Washington Browne. Peddie's assistant and job architect was John Wilson.

When first built, the hotel had 205 rooms, with decor in the style of Louis XV. The grand arches at the front of the hotel also provided access to the railway station below. The red sandstone facade has been a city landmark throughout the hotel's history.

In 1965, Princes Street Station was closed, and it was demolished by 1970. This provided room for expansion of the hotel, and the cast iron gates at the entrance to a car park in Rutland Street are the only remainder of the station outwith the hotel.  The original station clock, pre-dating the fire of 1890, has been preserved in the hotel.

Refurbishment
Queens Moat Houses sold the Caledonian to Hilton International in March 2000 for £44.2m, and it was renamed the Caledonian Hilton Edinburgh. A £24 million refurbishment in 2011 put the hotel within the luxury flagship Waldorf Astoria brand, and it was renamed Waldorf Astoria Edinburgh - The Caledonian. By the time of the refurbishment, the hotel had 241 rooms. The refurbishment plans included the addition and improvement of the public spaces, rooms, spa and restaurant. The original station concourse and ticket office were roofed over to provide a bar and lounge area, named Peacock Alley, which incorporates the station clock. The hotel's fine dining restaurant is named The Pompadour. The Pompadour was refurbished in 2021 and reopened under the name Dean Banks at The Pompadour. It also provides a Scottish restaurant, Grazing by Mark Greenaway, opened in 2019.The bar, known as the Caley Bar, is venue 50 at the Edinburgh Festival Fringe.

Hilton sold the Caledonian to Twenty14 Holdings, the hospitality investment arm of Abu Dhabi-based Lulu Group International, for £85m in January 2018. Hilton continues to manage the property, however. The new owners intend to remodel the hotel and add 50 more rooms, at a cost of £20m.

See also
 British Transport Hotels

References

Railway hotels in Scotland
Category A listed buildings in Edinburgh
Listed hotels in Scotland
Hotels in Edinburgh
Hilton Hotels & Resorts hotels
1903 establishments in Scotland
Hotels established in 1903
Hotel buildings completed in 1903